Loredana Popa (born 2 March 1999) is a Romanian footballer who plays as a forward. She has been a member of the Romania women's national team.

References

External links

1999 births
Living people
Romanian women's footballers
Women's association football forwards
Romania women's international footballers
FCU Olimpia Cluj players